Pissodes strobi, known as the white pine weevil or Engelmann spruce weevil, is the primary weevil attacking and destroying white pines. It was described in 1817 by William Dandridge Peck, professor of natural history and botany at Harvard University. The weevil is dark brown with white spots and is native to North America.

The eggs are laid inside a tree, usually white pine, Sitka spruce, white spruce, Engelmann spruce, or other pine or spruce, and the offspring feed on this tree until the host is killed.

Damage to white spruce and white pine
Severe damage to white spruce and white pine can be created by the white pine weevil.  Weevil resistance is a trait found in some trees and might be heritable.

A study showed that the resin (sap) released from wounds in white spruce leaders (tips) susceptible to the white pine weevil showed a different terpenoid composition than wounds induced in resistant white pine leaders. (Tomlin et al. 2000).

In coastal British Columbia, Sitka spruce trees developed a resistance against the white pine weevils which includes disruptions in egg & larvae development, deters host selection & mating, and delays the development of ovaries in female white pine weevils.

References

 

Molytinae
Insect vectors of plant pathogens
Taxa named by William Dandridge Peck
Beetles described in 1817